Sony Pictures Classics (SPC) is an American film production and distribution company that is a division of Sony Pictures. It was founded in 1992 by former Orion Classics heads Michael Barker, Tom Bernard and Marcie Bloom. It distributes, produces and acquires specialty films such as documentaries, independent and arthouse films in the United States and internationally. As of 2015, Barker and Bernard are co-presidents of the division.

This article lists films which have been produced, distributed and/or co-distributed by Sony Pictures Classics as well as upcoming releases.

1990s

2000s

2010s

2020s

Upcoming

Undated films

See also 
 Mongrel Media, the exclusive theatrical Canadian distributor for Sony Pictures Classics films

References

External links 
 

 
Sony Pictures Classics